The Ozone Atom is a French single-place paraglider that was designed by hang gliding and paragliding world champion pilot Robbie Whittall and produced by Ozone Gliders of Le Bar-sur-Loup. It remained in production as the Ozone 3 in 2016.

Design and development
The aircraft was designed as a beginner glider for school use in flight training and replaced the Ozone Element in production in that role.

The design has progressed through three generations of models, the Atom, Atom 2 and 3, each improving on the last. The models are each named for their relative size.

Operational history
Reviewer Noel Bertrand described the Ozone series of gliders in a 2003 review as, "wings that are both pleasant to fly and high performance in their respective categories".

Variants

Atom
Atom S
Small-sized model for lighter pilots. The glider model is DHV 1 certified.
Atom M
Mid-sized model for medium-weight pilots. The glider model is DHV 1 certified.
Atom L
Large-sized model for heavier pilots. The glider model is DHV 1 certified.

Atom 3
Atom 3 XXS
Very small-sized model for very light pilots. The glider model is EN-A certified.
Atom 3 XS
Extra small-sized model for very light pilots. The glider model is EN-A certified.
Atom 3 S
Small-sized model for light pilots. The glider model is EN-A certified.
Atom 3 M
Medium-sized model for mid-weight pilots. The glider model is EN-A certified.
Atom 3 L
Large-sized model for heavier pilots. The glider model is EN-A certified.

Specifications (Atom M)

References

External links

Atom
Paragliders